Lieutenant General Ananthanarayan Arun, YSM, SM, VSM is a serving general officer of the Indian Army. He currently serves as General Officer Commanding Dakshin Bharat Area. He earlier served as the officiating Commandant of the Officers Training Academy, Chennai.

Early life and education
Arun was born in Dindigul, Madurai in Tamil Nadu in June 1964. He secured an All India Rank of 13 in the Joint Entrance Examination for entry into the Indian Institute of Technology. He instead chose to join the National Defence Academy, as part of the 67th course. He then was part of the 77th course of the Indian Military Academy.

Military career
Arun was commissioned into the 8th battalion, The Grenadiers (8 GDRS) in December 1985. He attended the Defence Services Staff College, Wellington. In the rank of Colonel, he raised the 55th battalion, The Rashtriya Rifles (The Grenadiers). The battalion was deployed in a counter-insurgency role in Pulwama. For his command of 55 RR, he was awarded the Sena Medal for gallantry on 15 August 2005. In 2007, while still in command of 55 RR, he was awarded the Chief of the Army Staff's Commendation. He subsequently attended the Centre for Defence and Strategic Studies, Canberra.

Promoted to the rank of Brigadier, Arun commanded the 7 Sector Rashtriya Rifles in Handwara. For his command of 7 Sector RR, he was awarded the Yudh Seva Medal on 26 January 2014. He was then selected to attend the National Defence College in New Delhi, as part of the 55th course. 

As part of the United Nations, Arun has served in the United Nations Transitional Authority in Cambodia and in the International Task Force as part of the United Nations Mission in Sierra Leone. He also served at the Headquarters of the United Nations working on the forecasting and structuring of large coalitions including significant civilian components. Arun also attended the United Nations Senior Mission Leaders Course conducted in Geneva, Switzerland.

General officer
Arun was promoted to the rank of Major General and appointed General officer commanding a mountain division in the North East. He subsequently served as the Deputy Commandant, Chief Instructor, and officiating Commandant of the Officers Training Academy, Chennai. Promoted to the rank of Lieutenant General, he served as the Director General of Strategic Planning at Army headquarters.

On 2 January 2021, Arun was appointed the General Officer Commanding Dakshin Bharat Area. Earlier called the Andhra, Tamil Nadu, Karnataka, and Kerala Area (ATNK&K Area), the Dakshin Bharat area is a static formation that provides administrative, logistical, and infrastructure support to formations and establishments in these states as well as the union territories of Puducherry and Lakshadweep. In February 2022, he took over as the Colonel of the Grenadiers from Lieutenant General Rajeev Sirohi.

Personal life
Arun is married to Roopa Arun, an educationist and founder principal of The Cambridge International School, Bangalore. The couple has a daughter Zephyr.

Awards and decorations
Arun was awarded the Sena Medal in 2005, the Yudh Seva Medal in 2014, and the Vishisht Seva Medal in 2015. He has also been awarded the Chief of the Army Staff's Commendation 4 times.

References

Living people
Indian generals
Indian Army officers
Recipients of the Yudh Seva Medal
Recipients of the Sena Medal
Recipients of the Vishisht Seva Medal
National Defence Academy (India) alumni
Defence Services Staff College alumni
National Defence College, India alumni